The 1930 Millsaps Majors football team represented Millsaps College as a member of the Southern Intercollegiate Athletic Association (SIAA) during the 1930 college football season. The team defeated West Tennessee State Teachers, Mississippi A&M, Mississippi State Teachers, and Louisiana Tech. The team was led by head coach Edwin Hale.

Schedule

References

Millsaps
Millsaps Majors football seasons
Millsaps Majors football